A ficelle is a type of French bread loaf, made with yeast and similar to a baguette but much thinner. The word ficelle literally means "string" in French. 

French breads